Husson's yellow bat (Rhogeessa (Rhogeessa) hussoni) is a species of vesper bat found in Suriname and southern Brazil.

Description
Husson's yellow bat is primarily distinguished from other species in the genus Rhogeessa (particularly from R. io which is also found in Brazil) by its fur colour. Both its ventral and dorsal fur is golden brown with brown tips. Its muzzle is similar to that found in the genus Eptesicus with more obvious pads than R. io. Cranial measurements including breadth of the upper canines and palate, and the length of the teeth across the maxillary bone were all larger in Husson's yellow bat.

Conservation status
There have been difficulties capturing vesper bats using the usual methods and problems differentiating the different species within the genus Rhogeessa. As a results of this, very little is known about the species and the IUCN has listed it as data deficient. It is likely to be threatened by loss of habitat.

References

External links

Rhogeessa
Bats of South America
Bats of Brazil
Endemic fauna of Brazil
Endemic fauna of Suriname
Mammals of Suriname
Mammals described in 1996